Yuriy Eduardovich Sadovenko is a Russian Deputy Minister of Defence and recipient of Order of Military Merit and Medal of Suvorov.

Biography

Sadovenko was born on September 11, 1969, in Zhytomyr, Ukrainian Soviet Socialist Republic. He graduated from Ryazan Higher Airborne Command School in 1990 and the same year began serving in the Russian Armed Forces where he was a participant in combat operations. Four years later he served at the Ministry of Emergency Situations where he used to rescue and provide humanitarian aid until 2002, and from that year until 2007. From 2002 to 2007, he was an Assistant to the Minister in the same place. In 2007, he became Head of the Office there, and from May to November 2012 became the Head of the Executive Office of the Moscow Oblast. On January 9, 2013, Sadovenko was appointed as a Head of the Office by Presidential Decree.

Sanctions
Sadovenko was included under US sanctions in July 2022.

References

1969 births
Living people
Russian colonel generals
Recipients of the Order of Military Merit (Russia)
Recipients of the Order of Honour (Russia)
Ryazan Guards Higher Airborne Command School alumni
Deputy Defence Ministers of Russia